The Battle of Changsha (6 September – 8 October 1941) was Japan's second attempt at taking the city of Changsha, China, the capital of Hunan Province, as part of the Second Sino-Japanese War.

See also
Battle of Changsha (1939)
Battle of Changsha (1941–1942)
Battle of Changsha (1944)
Battle of Changsha (TV series), the TV series depicting this event

References

Changsha 1941
Changsha 1941
History of Changsha
1941 in China
1941 in Japan
September 1941 events
October 1941 events